Ronald Charles Beavis (better known professionally as Ron Beavis) is a Canadian protein biochemist, who has been involved in the application of mass spectrometry to protein primary structure, with applications in the fields of proteomics and analytical biochemistry. He has developed methods for measuring the identity and post-translational modification state of proteins obtained from biological samples using mass spectrometry. He is currently best known for developing new methods for analyzing proteomics data and applying the results of these methods to problems in computational biology.

Background
Ronald Charles Beavis was born in Winnipeg, Manitoba in May 1958. He went to school in Winnipeg and became interested in science at an early age. As a high school student he participated in the Manitoba Science Fair for projects related to chemistry and physics. He received a B.Sc. (Hons) in Zoology and Physics and a Ph.D. (Physics) from the University of Manitoba.

Current status
Dr. Beavis is the founder of Beavis Informatics Ltd, a Canadian company providing consulting services in the general area of mass spectrometry-based proteomics. He oversees the development and operation of the GPM & GPMDB projects.

Professional affiliations
Dr. Beavis was a founding member of Genome Prairie and one of the founders of ProteoMetrics, LLC. He has held academic positions at Rockefeller University, Memorial University of Newfoundland and Labrador, New York University Medical Center, the University of British Columbia and the University of Manitoba. He served on the Editorial Advisory Boards of the Journal of Proteome Research and Rapid Communications in Mass Spectrometry. He has also served on the Editorial Board of Molecular & Cellular Proteomics and on the Editorial Board of Scientific Data. He was part of the Human Proteome Project and a founding member of the U.S. Chromosome 17 project. He has frequently collaborated with David Fenyő on informatics projects.

Honors and awards

 NATO Postdoctoral Fellowship (1987)
 President's Award for Innovation, Eli Lilly & Co. (1999)
 Yen Fellowship (2003)
 Tier I Canada Research Chair (2007)

References

Most recent publications

1958 births
Living people
Canadian biochemists
People from Winnipeg